Hristo Marashliev (born 14 February 1970) is a former Bulgarian footballer who played as a striker. He is the son of Bulgarian former player and manager Dimitar Marashliev.

Honours
Sliven
 Bulgarian Cup: 1989–90

CSKA Sofia
 Bulgarian League: 1991–92

References

External links
 Player Profile

1970 births
Living people
Bulgarian footballers
Bulgaria youth international footballers
Association football forwards
First Professional Football League (Bulgaria) players
PFC CSKA Sofia players
PFC Slavia Sofia players
PFC Spartak Varna players
PFC Cherno More Varna players
Liga Portugal 2 players
Associação Académica de Coimbra – O.A.F. players
Bulgarian expatriate footballers
Expatriate footballers in Portugal
Bulgarian expatriate sportspeople in Portugal
Bulgarian football managers